Oleksandr Ponomariov (23 April 1918 – 7 June 1973) was a Soviet football player and manager.

Career
Ponomarev was born in Horlivka (near Donetsk), Ukrainian People's Republic. As a player, in the course of his career, he won the Soviet Cup in 1949 with Torpedo Moscow, and scored 152 goals in the Soviet Top League. He was the top scorer of the league in 1946. He spent the last two seasons of his playing career in Shakhter Stalino where he captained the team to the third place in the Soviet Top League in 1951 (the highest achievement of the team so far).

In 1953 he started his manager career in Shakhtar Stalino. He helped the club win the Soviet First League in 1954 (earning them promotion back to the top league).

In 1960-1961 he managed Avangard Kharkov, under him the club finished 6th in the Soviet Top League in 1961, their highest achievement so far.

In 1962 he was made the manager of FC Dynamo Moscow, which finished 11th in the previous season, and which he led to a victory in the Soviet Top League in 1963.

He was the head coach of the Soviet Union national football team in 1972, leading the team to second place in UEFA Euro 1972, and to a bronze medal at the 1972 Olympic Games.

He died at age 55 in Moscow.

References
Profile
Brief biography at ukrsoccerhistory.com
Banyas, V. Oleksandr Ponomariov: how we will celebrate centurial of the legend (Олександр Пономарьов: як відзначимо століття легенди?). Ukrainian Premier League. 14 March 2018

1918 births
1973 deaths
People from Horlivka
Soviet footballers
Ukrainian footballers
Russian footballers
Association football forwards
Soviet Top League players
FC Rotor Volgograd players
FC Shakhtar Donetsk players
FC Torpedo Moscow players
Soviet football managers
FC Shakhtar Donetsk managers
FC Metalist Kharkiv managers
FC Dynamo Moscow managers
FC Ararat Yerevan managers
Soviet Union national football team managers
Soviet Top League managers
Soviet First League managers
UEFA Euro 1972 managers
Merited Coaches of the Soviet Union
Honoured Masters of Sport of the USSR
Sportspeople from Donetsk Oblast